Kusumanegara Heroes' Cemetery (also spelled Kusuma Negara; also known as Semaki Heroes' Cemetery) is a cemetery located in Yogyakarta, Indonesia. It is the final resting place of five National Heroes of Indonesia.

Description
The cemetery is located on Kusumanegara Street in Semaki, Umbulharjo, Yogyakarta. Aside from the graves, there is a central monument, meeting hall, and flag pole. A statue of General Sudirman, interred at the cemetery, stands at the front of the cemetery facing Kusumanegara Street.

, the cemetery held 1,914 graves. In November of that year it consisted of 1,065 persons from the Army, 156 from the Air Force, 56 from the Navy, 79 from the National Police, 404 civilians, and 131 unknown soldiers. Five of the interments are National Heroes of Indonesia.

History

Kusumanegara was established on 7 October 1945. It was under the Indonesian Ministry of Defence, with day-to-day maintenance handled by Kodam IV/Diponegoro. In 1972, oversight was transferred to the Social Ministry per Decree of the Minister of Defence number Skep. B/33/V/1972. As Indonesia became increasingly decentralised, in 2004 maintenance and oversight was transferred to the Social Ministry of Yogyakarta.

In 2009, per Law number 20 of 2009, the cemetery's formal title became Kusumanegara National Heroes' Cemetery. In December 2011, Kusumanegara was maintained by seventeen people, mostly volunteers. Maintenance is funded by the Social Ministry. It is open to the general public.

Interments

Conditions
Kusumanegara accepts both military and non-military interments, assuming certain conditions. To be buried at the cemetery, civilians must have already died, been declared a National Hero of Indonesia, received orders, decorations, or medals allowing burial in a heroes' cemetery, or received presidential approval after going through the commander of Kodim 0734 and the Governor of Yogyakarta; this is based on Decision of the Social Minister 05 Huk/1996.

To be buried at the cemetery, military personnel must have either been declared a National Hero, died in the line of duty while actively protecting the Republic of Indonesia, or received at least one of ten decorations, Civil servants in the Ministry of Defence, Armed Forces, or Police may be buried there if they have received at least one of six decorations.

Notable interments
 Cornel Simanjuntak, composer
 Katamso Darmokusumo, brigadier general killed during the 30 September Movement
 Oerip Soemohardjo, general and interim head of the Indonesian National Armed Forces
 Sardjito, first rector of Gadjah Mada University
 Sudirman, general and leader of the Indonesian National Armed Forces during the Indonesian National Revolution
 Sugiyono Mangunwiyoto, colonel killed during the 30 September Movement
 Supeno, government minister

See also
 Kalibata Heroes Cemetery
 Giri Tunggal Heroes' Cemetery

Notes

References
Footnotes

Bibliography

 
 
 
 

Cemeteries in Java
Buildings and structures in Yogyakarta
Tourist attractions in Yogyakarta